Anastasiya Mokhnyuk (born 1 January 1991) is a Ukrainian athlete who specialises in the heptathlon. She competed in the heptathlon event at the 2015 World Championships in Athletics in Beijing, China. She won the silver medal in the pentathlon at the 2016 IAAF World Indoor Championships.

On 14 April 2016 she tested positive for meldonium.

References

External links

1991 births
Living people
Ukrainian heptathletes
World Athletics Championships athletes for Ukraine
People from Nova Kakhovka
Doping cases in athletics
Ukrainian sportspeople in doping cases
Athletes (track and field) at the 2016 Summer Olympics
Olympic athletes of Ukraine
Sportspeople from Kherson Oblast
21st-century Ukrainian women